The IAR-827 was an agricultural aircraft built in Romania in the 1970s and 1980s. The penultimate member of the family of designs that began with the IAR-821, it was, like the others, a conventional low-wing monoplane with fixed, tailwheel undercarriage, and shared the all-metal construction of the IAR-826. The prototype flew in 1976, powered by a Lycoming IO-720 engine, but the production examples that followed all had the PZL-3S.

In 1981, the IAR-827 prototype was re-engined with a Pratt & Whitney Canada PT6A turboprop and redesignated first as the IAR-827TP and later as the IAR-828. Plans to produce the aircraft either with the Pratt & Whitney Canada engine or a Walter 601 never materialised.

Variants
 IAR-827 - prototype with Lycoming IO-720 engine
 IAR-827A - production version with PZL-3S engine
 IAR-827TP, later IAR-828 - turboprop version with Pratt & Whitney Canada PT6A-15AG

Specifications (IAR-827A)

References

 

Уголок неба

1970s Romanian agricultural aircraft
827
Aircraft first flown in 1976